Helms Amendment may refer one of two legislative actions initiated by US Senator Jesse Helms:

 Helms Amendment to the Foreign Assistance Act, US legislation designed to limit the use of foreign assistance funds for abortion.
 Helms AIDS Amendments, legislation designed to limit the use of government funds for AIDS educational materials.